Thomas Ryan Scrubb (born September 26, 1991 in Richmond, British Columbia) is a Canadian professional basketball player for Monbus Obradoiro of the Liga ACB.

College career
After playing at Vancouver College high school, Scrubb enrolled at Carleton University in 2009, and sat out the 2009–10 season. Playing alongside his brother Philip Scrubb, he won five straight CIS National Championships with the Ravens. He took home the CIS Defensive Player of the Year distinction in 2014 and 2015, while also earning All-CIS First Team honours in 2015. In 2013, Scrubb was presented with the Jack Donohue Trophy, being the Most Valuable Player of the CIS Championship. He was also a three-time CIS Tournament All-Star Team selection (2013, 2014, 2015).

Professional career
Scrubb kicked off his professional career with Kataja Basket, of the Finnish top-flight Korisliiga, in 2015. He also participated in the European-wide 4th-tier level FIBA Europe Cup with the club. Making a seamless transition to the professional game, he garnered eurobasket.com All-Korisliiga Forward of the Year and All-Korisliiga First Team honours as a rookie. He ended his Kataja stint at the completion of the 2015–16 campaign, and in May 2016, he inked a deal with the Gießen 46ers of the Basketball Bundesliga, the highest level basketball league in Germany.

In July 2017, Scrubb signed with S.S. Felice Scandone of Italy's top-flight league, the LBA.

On July 13, 2018, Scrubb signed with Pallacanestro Varese. He moved to French LNB Pro A outfit SIG Strasbourg in July 2019.

On June 11, 2020, Scrubb signed with the Ottawa Blackjacks of the Canadian Elite Basketball League (CEBL).

On July 21, 2020, Scrubb signed with JL Bourg in France. He averaged 8.2 points, 4.3 rebounds and 1.4 assists per game. On July 14, 2021, Scrubb signed with Monbus Obradoiro of the Liga ACB.

National team career 
At the 2011 World University Games, Scrubb reached the semifinals with Team Canada. In 2016, he played in the Olympic qualifying tournament with the senior Canadian men's national team, but they did not make it to the Rio games.

Personal
Scrubb's brother, Phil, is also a professional basketball player.

References

External links 
 Profile at basketball.ca
 Profile at eurobasket.com
 Profile at fiba.com
 Profile at legabasket.it 

1991 births
Living people
2019 FIBA Basketball World Cup players
Basketball people from British Columbia
British men's basketball players
Canadian expatriate basketball people in Finland
Canadian expatriate basketball people in France
Canadian expatriate basketball people in Germany
Canadian expatriate basketball people in Italy
Canadian men's basketball players
Canadian people of British descent
Carleton Ravens basketball players
Giessen 46ers players
JL Bourg-en-Bresse players
Kataja BC players
Lega Basket Serie A players
Liga ACB players
Obradoiro CAB players
Pallacanestro Varese players
People from Richmond, British Columbia
SIG Basket players
Small forwards
S.S. Felice Scandone players